Will Power, (Chinese: 法外風雲) is the 2013 TVB Anniversary drama. It premiered on October 14, 2013.

Synopsis
The two well known lawyers Yu Ying Wai, Wilson (Wayne Lai) and Lee Ming Yeung, Morris (Moses Chan) are against each other in court. Because Ying Wai wanted to win a case, it almost cost him his life and after that incident, he had a new view on life. Experienced lawyer Lo Sam Po (Elliot Ngok) viewed the changed Wai differently, and recruited him to join his law firm as a probate lawyer. Due to his debt, Yeung was forced to go back and work at his mentor Paul Sum Yik Wor's (King Sir) law firm and collaborates with his daughter and lawyer Sum Yut Kan, Eugene (Fala Chen). Kan had been in a relationship with the wealthy Sung Ka Yiu, Glibert (Vincent Wong) for many years, but Yiu loves merit too much and had no interest in ambitions, which gave Yeung an opportunity to win Kan's heart. When the hearing for a case involving a will began, the judge happened to be Wai's ex-wife and Yeung's ex-girlfriend Luk Sze Ying, Sheila (Christine Ng), the two heroes meet again, but together they discovered there was another side to the case. The person involved just happened to be Wai's apprentice Ching Ka-ming  (Jason Chan), who had a huge connection to the case. The actions of the lawyer lifted a crisis of life and death...

The two lawyers battle for wins but one man goes too far to get what he wants from his biggest client...Yeung's boss.

Cast

Viewership ratings

International Broadcast
  - 8TV
  - Mediacorp Channel U

References

External links
TVB's official website
K-TVB.net English Synopsis

TVB dramas
Hong Kong drama television series
Television series set in the 2010s
2013 Hong Kong television series debuts
2013 Hong Kong television series endings